Copelatus brivioi is a species of diving beetle. It is part of the genus Copelatus in the subfamily Copelatinae of the family Dytiscidae. It was described by Rocchi in 1976.

References

brivioi
Beetles described in 1976